Sundarpur may refer to several places:

In Nepal
Sundarpur, Mahottari
Sundarpur, Morang
Sundarpur, Sarlahi
Sundarpur, Udayapur

In India
 Sundarpur, Khurda, Orissa
 Sundarpur, Bihar